Krzysztof Łukasz Król (born February 6, 1987) is a Polish footballer who currently is a coach for the US youth U12 team the Elmhurst City Soccer Association (ECSA) .

Career
Król played with the youth teams of Górnik Radlin, WSP Wodzisław Śląski and Amica Wronki, before signing his first professional contract with Dyskobolia Grodzisk in 2006. He made his professional debut for Grodzisk in the Polish Ekstraklasa in August 2006.

In early 2007 Król joined Real Madrid's third team. At the start of the 2007/08 season he was briefly promoted to Real Madrid Castilla but did not make any appearances. In July 2008, having failed to make an impression in Spain, he returned to his native Poland and signed a three-year contract with Jagiellonia Białystok.

In January 2010 Chicago Fire of Major League Soccer signed the Polish defender from Jagiellonia on a one-year loan deal. He made his MLS debut on April 3, 2010 against Colorado Rapids.

On November 24, 2010, it was announced that the Chicago Fire parted ways with Krol 

In July 2011, he joined Podbeskidzie Bielsko-Biała on a two-year contract.

Signed by Impact de Montréal on June 26, 2014. On 24 June 2015, he signed with Greek side AEL Kalloni for a two years contract for an undisclosed fee.

Personal life
On June 17, 2010, he married model Patrycja Mikula. On March 19, 2011, nine months after their wedding, Mikula gave birth to the couple's first child, a son named Cristiano.

Successes

 1x Divizia Naţională (2012/13) with Sheriff Tiraspol.
 1x Polish Cup Winner (2009/2010) with Jagiellonia Białystok.

References

External links 
  
 
 Montreal Impact roster

1987 births
Living people
People from Rydułtowy
Polish footballers
Poland youth international footballers
Polish expatriate footballers
Dyskobolia Grodzisk Wielkopolski players
Expatriate footballers in Spain
Polish expatriate sportspeople in Spain
Real Madrid C footballers
Real Madrid Castilla footballers
Ekstraklasa players
Jagiellonia Białystok players
Chicago Fire FC players
CF Montréal players
Expatriate soccer players in Canada
Polish expatriate sportspeople in Canada
Expatriate soccer players in the United States
Polish expatriate sportspeople in the United States
Major League Soccer players
Polonia Bytom players
Podbeskidzie Bielsko-Biała players
FC Sheriff Tiraspol players
Expatriate footballers in Moldova
Polish expatriate sportspeople in Moldova
Piast Gliwice players
AEL Kalloni F.C. players
Moldovan Super Liga players
Sportspeople from Silesian Voivodeship
Association football fullbacks